Otiorhynchus meridionalis, the lilac root weevil, is a species of broad-nosed weevil in the family Curculionidae. It is found in North America. They are common landscape pests, feeding on lilac, euonymous and peonies.

Larvae feed on plant roots, while adult insects feed on leaves, eating only the edges in form of numerous U-shaped notches. They are commonly present on North American lilac, but seldom create lasting damage to the plant.

Adult insects are nocturnal. Like other root weevils (O. ovatus, O. rugostriatus and O. sulcatus), they often wander into households during hot summer months in search for shade and moisture. Although harmless to humans, pets and furnishings, they pose a nuisance. Treatment with pyrethroid-based insecticides is recommended only in cases of severe infestations, and occasional bug is best tolerated or removed mechanically.

References

Further reading

External links

 

Entiminae
Articles created by Qbugbot
Beetles described in 1834